The Škoda Works was one of the largest European industrial conglomerates of the 20th century, founded by Czech engineer Emil Škoda in 1859 in Plzeň, then in the Kingdom of Bohemia, Austrian Empire. It is the predecessor of today's Škoda Auto, Doosan Škoda Power and Škoda Transportation companies.

History

1859–1899: establishment of Škoda

The noble Waldstein family founded the company in 1859 in Plzeň, and Emil Škoda bought it in 1869. It soon established itself as Austria-Hungary's leading arms manufacturer producing heavy guns for the navy, mountain guns or mortars along with the Škoda M1909 machine gun as one of its noted products. Besides producing arms for the Austro-Hungarian Army, Škoda has ever since also manufactured locomotives, aircraft, ships, machine tools, steam turbines and equipment for power utilities.

In 1859, Count Wallenstein-Vartenberk set up a branch of his foundry and engineering works in Plzeň. The output of the plant, employing over 100 workers, included machinery and equipment for sugar mills, breweries, mines, steam engines, boilers, iron bridge structures, and railway facilities. In 1869, the plant was taken over by Emil Škoda, an industrious engineer and dynamic entrepreneur.

Škoda soon expanded the firm, and in the 1880s, he founded what was then a very modern steelworks capable of delivering castings weighing dozens of tons. Steel castings and later forgings for larger passenger liners and warships went on to rank alongside the sugar mills as the top export branches of Škoda's factory.

1899–1945: before and during World War II

In 1899, the ever-expanding business was transformed into a joint-stock company, and before World War I, Škoda Works had become the largest arms manufacturer in Austria-Hungary. It was a navy and army contractor, mainly supplying heavy guns and ammunition.

Exports included castings, such as part of the piping for the Niagara Falls power plant and for the Suez Canal sluices as well as machinery for sugar mills in Turkey, breweries throughout Europe, and guns for the Far East and South America.

World War I brought a drop in the output of peacetime products. Huge sums were invested into expanding production capacities. By then, Škoda Works held majorities in a number of companies in the Czech lands and abroad that were not involved in arms manufacture. In 1917, the company had 35,000 employees in Plzeň alone.

Following the emergence of the Czechoslovak Republic in 1918, the complex economic conditions of postwar Europe caused the company to be transformed from what was exclusively an arms manufacturer into a multi-sector concern. In addition to traditional branches, the production programme embraced a number of new concepts, such as steam (and later electric) locomotives, freight and passenger vehicles, aircraft, ships, machine tools, steam turbines, power-engineering equipment, etc.

In 1923, the company's world-famous registered trademark, the winged arrow in a circle, was entered in the Companies Register. The deteriorating political situation in Europe saw arms production rise again in the mid-1930s.

Škoda manufactured the triple-barreled gun turrets for the s of the Austro-Hungarian navy. Prior to World War II, Škoda produced LT-35 tanks, which are better known under their German designation, Panzer 35(t). They were originally produced for the Czechoslovak Army and were used extensively by the Wehrmacht in the Polish campaign, the Fall of France and the German invasion of the Soviet Union. In July 1944, Škoda started production of the Jagdpanzer 38(t).

In 1924, Škoda Works acquired the Laurin & Klement car manufacturer, later known as Škoda Auto. The companies were separated after 1945, when all of the Czechoslovak economy was nationalised.

Mountain guns produced by Škoda

 Škoda 75 mm Model 15 
 Škoda 75 mm Model 1928
 Škoda 75 mm Model 1936
 Škoda 75 mm Model 1939
 Škoda 100 mm Model 1916
 Škoda 100 mm Model 16/19
 Škoda 105 mm Model 1939
 Škoda 150 mm Model 1918

Other weapons produced by Škoda
 Škoda M1909 machine gun
 3,7cm KPÚV vz. 34 - anti-tank gun
 3,7cm KPÚV vz. 37 - anti-tank gun
 3,7cm ÚV vz. 38 ( A7) - used on LT vz. 38 light tank
 Skoda 47mm SFK L/33 H
 Skoda 47mm SFK L/44 S
 Škoda 7 cm K10
 Škoda 7.5 cm d/29 Model 1911
 Škoda 76.5 mm L/50
 Škoda 10 cm K10
 Škoda 10 cm vz. 38 howitzer
 85 mm vz. 52
 Škoda 10 cm vz. 53
 Škoda 14 cm/56
 Škoda 15 cm K10
 Škoda 149 mm K-series
 Škoda 149 mm K1 / Model 1933
 Škoda 149 mm K4 / Model 1937
 Škoda 19 cm vz. 1904
 21 cm Kanone 39
 210 mm gun M1939 (Br-17)
 24 cm Haubitze 39
 Škoda 24 cm L/40 K97
 Škoda 305 mm Model 1911
 Škoda 30.5 cm /45 K10
 305 mm howitzer M1939 (Br-18)
 42 cm Haubitze M. 14/16

1945–1989: after World War II 

In 1945, the year that nationalisation efforts began in Czechoslovakia, Škoda was nationalised, and many sections were split from the company. The car works in Mladá Boleslav became Automobilové závody, národní podnik, AZNP, today's Škoda Auto, and the aircraft plant in Prague and truck plant became part of a conglomerate of nine truck producers headquartered in Liberec as LIAZ (Liberecké automobilové závody), although the trucks were still marketed as Škodas. Some factories in Slovakia were also split off, and other plants produced food-industry equipment.

The company was renamed Závody Vladimíra Iljiče Lenina (Vladimir Ilyich Lenin Works) in 1953, but since the new name caused losses of sales abroad, the name was changed back to Škoda in 1965.

The factory concentrated on markets in the Soviet Union and the Eastern Bloc. The company produced a wide range of heavy machinery such as nuclear reactors and locomotives. A lack of updates to its product designs and infrastructure considerably weakened the company's competitive position and its brand.

After 1962, Škoda became well known in the Soviet Union and other countries as a trolley bus manufacturer after it began to export Škoda 9 Tr, one of its most successful models. The successor, Škoda 14 Tr, manufactured between 1982 and 1997, is still widely used, for example, in post-Soviet states.

In 1978, the company was turned into the government-owned group of companies ("koncern") Škoda. It was based in Plzeň and consisted of the companies: První brněnská strojírna (First Machine Works of Brno), ČKD Blansko, ČKD Dukla Praha-Karlín in Prague, Slovenské energetické strojárne S. M. Kirova (Slovak S. M. Kirov Energy Machine Works) in Tlmače, and Výzkumný ústav energetických zařízení (Energy Facilities Research Institute) in Brno.

1989–2011: after fall of communism 

After the Communist Party lost power in late 1989, the company was privatized into the hands of management. Mismanagement and asset stripping led to a collapse. The company was restructured and some factories closed. Except for some smaller companies named Škoda and Škoda Auto, after the chaotic 1990s period, the Czech Škoda companies were again regrouped within the holding company Škoda Holding a.s. in 2000. In 2010, the holding company changed its name to Škoda Investment, a.s..

Following the change in the political climate in 1989, Škoda started along a path of privatisation and used the time to come up with an optimal production programme, make new business contacts and look for markets other than those that had so far been its priority markets, communist countries.

In 1991, a foreign partner for the passenger car works Škoda Auto a.s. was sought by the Czech government. Volkswagen was chosen, and the German firm initially took a 30% stake, rising to 100% ownership by 1999. Škoda Auto is now a completely-independent entity from other companies bearing the Škoda name.

In 1992, the company was privatised by the so-called Czech method. It began expanding its production activities, acquiring the Tatra and LIAZ vehicle works and constructing a plant to produce aluminum soft drink cans. The expansion put the company's financial stability in jeopardy. In 1999, it concluded an agreement with creditor banks, and the restructuring of the entire capital structure of the Škoda group was undertaken. The result was the legal and financial stability at the company. Currently, a sectoral restructuring of production companies in the group is under way. In April 2000, Škoda Holding a.s. took over the helm, controlling nineteen primary subsidiaries and most product lines.

In 2003, the Czech government sold its 49% stake to the Appian Group for 350 million CZK;(in 2020, equivalent to 14,78 million USD) later that year the Appian Group acquired the rest of its stake in a liquidation of the previous owner. The Appian Group is a holding company incorporated in the Netherlands and controlled through a screen of shell companies. The real owner or owners are unknown, despite investigations by the Czech police. In September 2010, a group of four current or former Škoda or Appian managers announced that it would acquire Škoda from Appian for an undisclosed price. The Czech media speculated that the acquisition was only a formality, as the managers probably owned the parent company Appian.

Škoda was then focused solely on the transport sector. Other divisions have been sold, a large part of them to the Russian company OMZ (the price was not published, estimated at 1 billion CZK). Some smaller transport companies were acquired, such as part of the Hungarian company Ganz, VÚKV (owner of the Velim railway test circuit) and some transport-related assets of the former ČKD, now called Škoda Vagonka. In 2009, Škoda holding announced that the South Korean conglomerate Doosan would acquire its power section for 11,5 billion CZK (US$656 million). Finally, in March 2011, Škoda sold its Škoda Transportation subsidiary to Cyprus-based company Škoda Industry (Europe) Ltd, later renamed CEIL (Central Europe Industries) Ltd.

As of 2012, Škoda Investment still owns the Škoda brand and some real estate but does not perform any industrial activity. Between 2007 and 2012, the company paid dividends to Appian, a sum of 32 billion CZK (1.18 billion euro or US$1.6 billion).

Škoda products 

Škoda Transportation produces various types of trolleybuses, tramcars, locomotives and rapid transit train systems. More can be found at: List of Škoda Transportation products.

Former subsidiaries 

 Power division sold to Doosan produces as Doosan Škoda Power (former Škoda Power) steam turbines, heat exchangers and condensers
 Metallurgy division held by United Group produces as Pilsen Steel (former Škoda, Hutě, Plzeň) crankshafts, turbine components or ingots
 Nuclear division sold to OMZ produces as Škoda JS equipment for nuclear plants or oil refining, petrochemical and gas industry
 Transportation division produces as Škoda Transportation trolleybuses, tramcars, electric locomotives, electric multiple units and rapid transit train systems.
 Škoda Praha sold to ČEZ Group is supplier of power generation projects and their technological parts.
 Former Škoda Vyzkum research institute now operating as VZÚ Plzeň
 TS Plzeň a.s. (former Škoda TS) is active in heavy engineering, doing curing presses, hydraulic presses, equipment for rolling-mill plants and equipment for sugar-cane refineries.
 Brush SEM, owned by UK based FKI, manufactures generators.
 Pilsen Tools s.r.o. and Škoda Machine Tool a.s. are active in the machine tool sector.
 Czech Precision Forge a.s. does open- die and closed-die forging of steel and non-ferrous alloys.
 MKV Ozubená kola s.r.o. and Wikov Gear s.r.o.  produce gearboxes and gear wheels.

See also 
 :Category:Škoda locomotives
 :Category:Škoda trams
 Electric Transit, Inc.
 List of the largest artificial non-nuclear explosions

References

Further reading
 Grant, Jonathan A. (2018). Between Depression and Disarmament: The International Armaments Business, 1919–1939. Cambridge: Cambridge University Press. . . Online review. Focus on munitions production in the interwar period.

External links

 
 History of Škoda in photos: part 1, part 2, part 3 (photo descriptions in Czech)
 List of existing steam locomotives built by Skoda
 History of Škoda from corporate website
 

.
Bus manufacturers of the Czech Republic
Tram manufacturers
Trolleybus manufacturers
Companies of Austria-Hungary
Electric vehicle manufacturers of Czechoslovakia
Electric vehicle manufacturers of the Czech Republic
Locomotive manufacturers of the Czech Republic
Manufacturing plants in Slovakia
Plzeň
19th-century establishments in Bohemia
Manufacturing companies established in 1859
1859 establishments in the Austrian Empire
Conglomerate companies established in 1925
1925 establishments in Czechoslovakia
Vehicle manufacturing companies established in 1859